Pulobha is a village in the Nicobar district of Andaman and Nicobar Islands, India. It is located on the Little Nicobar Island, and is administered as part of the Great Nicobar tehsil.

Demographics 

The village was severely affected by the 2004 Indian Ocean earthquake and tsunami, and a number of its Shompen residents went missing. According to the 2011 census of India, Pulobha had only 6 households with 52 people. The effective literacy rate (i.e. the literacy rate of population excluding children aged 6 and below) is 44.74%.

References 

Villages in Great Nicobar tehsil